Everyone's in Love is a 1959 Italian comedy film directed by Giuseppe Orlandini.

Cast
 
 Carlotta Barilli
 Clara Bindi
 Nando Bruno - Cesare
 Memmo Carotenuto - Ferruccio
 Grazia Colelli
 Livia Cordaro
 
 Gabriele Ferzetti - Arturo
 Ruggero Marchi - Ermanno Barberio
 Marcello Mastroianni - Giovanni
 Marisa Merlini - Jolanda
 Orlando Pallamari
 Polidor
 Jacqueline Sassard - Allegra Barberio
 Leopoldo Trieste - Cipriani

References

External links

Everyone's in Love at Variety Distribution

1959 films
1959 comedy films
1950s Italian-language films
Italian black-and-white films
Films directed by Giuseppe Orlandini
Films directed by Franco Rossi
Italian comedy films
1950s Italian films